Filipe da Silva Tavares Vieira (born 28 October 1996 in Santa Maria da Feira), known as Vieirinha, is a Portuguese professional footballer who plays for SC São João de Ver as an attacking midfielder.

References

External links

1996 births
Living people
Sportspeople from Santa Maria da Feira
Portuguese footballers
Association football midfielders
Liga Portugal 2 players
Campeonato de Portugal (league) players
C.D. Feirense players
A.D. Sanjoanense players
S.C. Salgueiros players
Gondomar S.C. players
Académico de Viseu F.C. players
S.C. Espinho players
SC São João de Ver players